West Mall is a shopping centre located in Bukit Batok, Singapore, next to Bukit Batok MRT station.

Background
It was opened in 1998. West Mall houses a mix of retailers, such as fashion and accessory vendors, jewellery retailers, gifts and specialty stores, telcos, cafes and restaurants, a food court, a six-screen theatre, post office, community library, music school, electrical and household store and a supermarket. The mall also has a carpark occupying three basement levels.

The latest addition to the mall was a Cathay Cineplex, which replaced WE Cinema (formerly Eng Wah Cinemas) in February 2013.

References

External links

Anchor Tenants
Bukit Batok Public Library
Cathay Cineplex
Cold Storage
Harvey Norman

Bukit Batok
Shopping malls in Singapore
Shopping malls established in 2007